Madlax is a 26-episode anime television series produced in 2004 by the Bee Train animation studio. Its original soundtrack was created by the well-known composer Yuki Kajiura, partly in collaboration with Yuuka Nanri (as part of FictionJunction Yuuka). Two OST albums and two singles were released by Victor Entertainment in the same year.

Madlax OST I 

Track listing
  Galza (2:55)
  Nowhere (3:45)
  Limelda (2:12)
  Calm Days (3:15)
  Midnight (2:01)
  A Pursuit (2:01)
  Elenore (4:20)
  The Story Begins (2:59)
  Vanessa (2:01)
  To Find Your Flower (2:22)
  No Man's Land (3:02)
  The Day, Too Far (2:16)
  Calm Violence (2:40)
  Cradle (1:51)
  Battlefield (2:48)
  Quanzitta (1:59)
  Enfant (2:08)
  In a Foreign Town (3:14)
  Flame (2:32)
  Dawnlight (2:02)
  Peace in Your Mind (1:59)
  Margaret (3:14)
  Hitomi no Kakera (4:16)

Madlax OST II 

Track listing
  We Are One (2:02)
  Your Place (2:22)
  Open Your Box (2:44)
  Fall on You (2:12)
  Lost Command (2:51)
  Saints (3:52)
  A Plot (2:41)
  People Are People (2:54)
  Complicated (2:03)
  Cannabinoids (3:33)
  Friday (3:03)
  If I Die (2:22)
  Gazth-Sonika (3:02)
  Places of the Holy (3:32)
  A Tropical Night (2:17)
  Hearts (2:49)
  Cold (1:59)
  We're Gonna Groove (3:46)
  Street Corner (2:15)
  She's Gotta Go (3:01)
  Bank on Me (2:20)
  I Defend You (1:59)
  Madlax (3:14)
  Inside Your Heart (3:45)

References 

Anime soundtracks
Film and television discographies
Discographies of Japanese artists
Albums